Marie Lindberg may refer to:

Marie Lindberg (cyclist), Swedish road cyclist
Marie Lindberg (singer), Swedish schoolteacher, singer/songwriter and guitarist.